Road districts were established in the colony of Victoria, Australia, pursuant to legislation passed in 1853 and were an early form of local government in Victoria. The districts were outside towns, which were instead incorporated either as municipalities or boroughs. The road districts were created between 1853 and 1871.

Road districts were established after public meetings to discuss boundaries etc. followed by a petition to the governor. Upon the proclamation of a district a public meeting was held to elect officers of the Road Board, which was responsible for the building and maintenance of local roads and bridges and raised finance from rates levied on landowners.

From 1862 many road districts became shires, pursuant to the District Councils Bill 1862, with additional responsibilities related to pounds, slaughtering licences, thistles, dogs, licensed publicans, brewer's and spirit merchants' licences and commons. They were also permitted to borrow money for permanent works.

Road districts included:

References

Victoria (Australia)-related lists